Tracey Ullman (born Trace Ullman; 30 December 1959) is a British-American actress, comedian, singer, writer, producer, and director. Her earliest mainstream appearances were on British television sketch comedy shows A Kick Up the Eighties (with Rik Mayall and Miriam Margolyes) and Three of a Kind (with Lenny Henry and David Copperfield). After a brief singing career, she appeared as Candice Valentine in Girls on Top with Dawn French and Jennifer Saunders.

Ullman emigrated from the United Kingdom to the United States. She would go on to star in her own network television comedy series, The Tracey Ullman Show from 1987 until 1990, which also featured the first appearances of the long-running animated media franchise The Simpsons. She later produced programmes for HBO, including Tracey Takes On... (1996–99) garnering numerous awards. Her sketch comedy series Tracey Ullman's State of the Union ran from 2008 to 2010 on Showtime. She has appeared in several feature films. Ullman was the first British woman to be offered her own television sketch show in both the United Kingdom and the United States.

In 2016, she returned to British television with the BBC sketch comedy show Tracey Ullman's Show, her first project for the broadcaster in over thirty years. This led to the creation of the topical comedy series Tracey Breaks the News in 2017.

In 2017, Ullman was reportedly Britain's richest comedian and second-richest British actress, with an estimated wealth of £80 million. She is the recipient of numerous accolades, including twelve American Comedy Awards, seven Primetime Emmy Awards, two British Academy Film Awards, four Satellite Awards, a Golden Globe Award, and a Screen Actors Guild Award.

Early life

Tracey Ullman was born Trace Ullman in Slough, Buckinghamshire (now Berkshire), the younger of two daughters, to Doreen (née Cleaver; 1929–2015), who was of British and Roma extraction, and Anthony John Ullman (1917–1966), a Roman Catholic Pole. Anthony served in the Polish Army and took part in the Battle of Dunkirk during World War II. After emigrating and marrying in England, he worked as a solicitor, a furniture salesman, and a travel agent. He also brokered marriages and translated among the émigré Polish community.

When she was six, Ullman's father, who had been recovering from a heart operation, died of a heart attack in front of her. She was subsequently uprooted to Hackbridge, southwest London. Her mother could barely make ends meet without their father's income. In an effort to cheer her family up, Ullman, along with her sister Patti, created and performed nightly shows on their mother's bedroom windowsill. After their mother remarried, the family began moving around the country, with Ullman attending numerous state schools, where she wrote and performed in school plays.

She eventually caught the attention of a headmaster, who recommended that she attend a performing arts school. She won a full scholarship to the Italia Conti Academy at the age of twelve. At sixteen, she attended a dance audition under the impression that she was applying for summer season in Scarborough. The audition resulted in a contract with a German ballet company for a revival of Gigi in Berlin. Upon returning to England, she joined the Second Generation dance troupe, performing in London, Blackpool, and Liverpool. She branched out into musical theatre and was cast in numerous West End musicals including Grease, Elvis The Musical, and The Rocky Horror Show.

Music career

A chance encounter with the wife of the head of the punk music label Stiff Records led to Ullman getting a record contract in 1983. Label owner Dave Robinson was taken with some of the musical parodies she had been doing in her television work and signed her. Ullman recounted, "One day, I was at my hairdresser, and Dave Robinson's wife Rosemary leant over and said, 'Do you want to make a record?'... I went, 'Yeah I want to make a record.' I would have tried anything."

Her 1983 debut album You Broke My Heart in 17 Places featured her first hit single "Breakaway", as well as the international hit version of label-mate Kirsty MacColl's "They Don't Know", which reached #2 in the UK, #35 in Germany and #8 in the United States. In less than two years, Ullman had six songs in the UK Top 100.

A recording of Doris Day's "Move Over Darling" reached #8 in the UK, and a version of Madness' "My Girl", which she changed to "My Guy". Its accompanying video featured a cameo from the British Labour Party politician Neil Kinnock, at the time the Leader of the Opposition.

Ullman's songs were over-the-top evocations of 1960s and 1970s pop music with a 1980s edge, "somewhere between Minnie Mouse and the Supremes" as Melody Maker put it, or "retro before retro was cool", as a reviewer wrote in 2002. Her career received another boost when the video for "They Don't Know" featured a cameo appearance from Paul McCartney; at the time Ullman was filming a minor role in McCartney's film Give My Regards to Broad Street. She released her second (and final) album You Caught Me Out in 1984. Her final hit, "Sunglasses" (1984), featured comedian Adrian Edmondson in its music video. During this time she also appeared as a guest VJ on MTV in the United States.

Television career

Early years
Ullman began her television career in 1980 playing Lynda Bellingham's daughter in the British series Mackenzie. "I really thought I was great when I did a quite serious soap opera for the BBC. I played a nice girl from St. John's Wood. 'Mummy, I think I'm pregnant. I don't know who's done it.' Then I would fall down a hill or something. 'EEEEE! Oh, no, lost another baby.' It seemed all I ever did was have miscarriages—or make yogurt."

Ullman appeared in Les Blair's avant-garde Four in a Million, an improvised play about club acts, at London's Royal Court Theatre. She won the London Critics Circle Theatre Award as Most Promising New Actress for her performance.

In 1981, she was cast in the BBC Scotland sketch comedy programme A Kick Up the Eighties. This led to her being offered her own show. "My first reaction was you must be joking, as women are treated so shoddily in comedy. Big busty barmaids and all those sort of clichés just bore me rigid." Eventually a deal was struck with the proviso being that she would get to choose the show's writers, have script approval, and choose the costumes. Three of a Kind, co-starring comedians Lenny Henry and David Copperfield debuted in 1981. This led to her winning her first BAFTA in 1984. She would soon go on to become a household name with the British media referring to her as "Our Trace".

In 1985, she signed on to star in the ITV sitcom Girls on Top. She was cast as the promiscuous golddigger Candice Valentine. The show, co-starring Dawn French, Ruby Wax, and Jennifer Saunders continued after Ullman bowed out after the first series. Saunders also wrote the scripts.

The Tracey Ullman Show
In 1985, Ullman was persuaded by her husband, British independent television producer Allan McKeown, to join him in Los Angeles, where he was already partially based. She set her sights on a film and stage career, believing that there was little in the way of television for her. Her British agent put together a videotape compilation of her work and began circulating it around Hollywood. The tape landed in the hands of Craig Kellem, vice president for comedy at Universal Television. A deal was immediately struck with CBS. I Love New York, a show about a "slightly wacky" British woman working in New York, was written by Saturday Night Live writer Anne Beatts. Unhappy with the direction the network wanted to take the show, Ullman's agent decided to contact producer James L. Brooks. Brooks felt that a sketch show would best suit her. "Why would you do something with Tracey playing a single character on TV when her talent requires variety? You can't categorize Tracey, so it's silly to come up with a show that attempted to." The Tracey Ullman Show debuted on 5 April 1987, along with Married... with Children. The show also produced The Simpsons as a series of animated shorts, or "bumpers", which would air before and after commercial breaks. The Simpsons shorts would eventually be spun-off into their own half-hour series in 1989. The Tracey Ullman Show was awarded ten Primetime Emmy Awards, with Ullman winning three, one in the category of Outstanding Individual Performance in a Variety or Music Program in 1990. The show was the first Fox network primetime show to win an Emmy award. The show concluded after a four-season run in 1990.

HBO
In 1991, Ullman's husband placed a successful bid on a television franchise in the South of England. The television programming lineup agreed upon included a Tracey Ullman special. Unlike the Fox show, this programme would be shot entirely on location. Tracey Ullman: A Class Act, a send-up of the British class system, premiered on 9 January 1993 on ITV. This led to HBO in America becoming interested in having a special made for their network, with the caveat that Ullman take on a more American subject. She chose New York City. Tracey Ullman Takes on New York debuted on 9 October 1993. The programme went on to win two Emmy Awards, a CableAce Award, an American Comedy Award, and a Writers Guild of America Award. The success led to the creation of the HBO sketch comedy series Tracey Takes On... in 1996.

Ullman returned to HBO in 2003 with the television special Tracey Ullman in the Trailer Tales, which she also directed. She returned to HBO again in 2005 with her one-woman stage show Tracey Ullman: Live and Exposed.

Purple Skirt and Oxygen
In 2001, Ullman took a break from her multi-character-based work and created a fashion-based talk show for Oxygen Network, Tracey Ullman's Visible Panty Lines. The series was spun-off from her e-commerce clothing store Purple Skirt. Interviewees included Arianna Huffington and Charlize Theron. The show ran for two seasons, concluding in 2002.

Showtime
Upon her naturalisation in the United States, it was announced in April 2007 that she would be making the switch from HBO to Showtime after working fourteen years with the former. Tracey Ullman's State of the Union, a new sketch comedy series, debuted on 30 March 2008. It ran for three seasons, concluding in 2010.

Return to British television
After a thirty year absence, Ullman returned to the BBC with the sketch comedy programme Tracey Ullman's Show in 2016. It aired in the United States on HBO. In 2017, the show earned its first Primetime Emmy Award nomination in the category of Outstanding Variety Sketch Series. In 2018, it garnered two additional Primetime Emmy Award nominations in the categories of Outstanding Variety Sketch Series and Outstanding Costumes for a Variety, Nonfiction, or Reality Programming. The show eventually led to the creation of the topical comedy programme Tracey Breaks the News in 2017.

Other notable work
In 1995, she became the first modern-day cartoon voice of Little Lulu. In 1999, she had a recurring role as an unconventional psychotherapist on Ally McBeal. Her performance garnered her a Primetime Emmy Award, her seventh, and an American Comedy Award which was her eleventh. In 2005, she co-starred with Carol Burnett in the television adaptation of Once Upon a Mattress. She played Princess Winnifred, a role originally made famous by Burnett on Broadway. This time Burnett took on the role of the overbearing Queen Aggravain.

In March 2014, Ullman was introduced as Genevieve Scherbatsky, the mother of character Robin Scherbatsky in How I Met Your Mother. On 15 February 2017, it was announced that she would star in the Starz-BBC co-produced limited series adaptation of Howards End, playing Aunt Juley Mund.

On 14 May 2019, it was announced that Ullman would be portraying Betty Friedan in the FX limited series Mrs. America. The nine-episode series premiered 15 April 2020 on Hulu to favourable reviews. Her performance garnered her an Outstanding Supporting Actress in a Limited Series or Movie Primetime Emmy nomination.

In 2021, Ullman plays councilwoman Irma Kostroski in the eleventh season of Curb Your Enthusiasm.

Film career
Along with her television work, Ullman has featured in many films throughout her career. Her first theatrical film was a small role in Paul McCartney's film Give My Regards to Broad Street (1984). This was followed by a supporting role in the drama Plenty (1985) starring  Meryl Streep. She made her big screen leading role debut in I Love You to Death (1990) acting alongside Kevin Kline, River Phoenix, and Joan Plowright. She appeared in lead and supporting roles in films such as Robin Hood: Men in Tights, Nancy Savoca's Household Saints, Bullets Over Broadway, Small Time Crooks, and A Dirty Shame. She was nominated for a Golden Globe Award in the category of Best Actress – Motion Picture Musical or Comedy for her work in Small Time Crooks in 2001. She played Jack's mother in the film adaptation of the Broadway musical Into the Woods (2014) and appeared in the musical film The Prom (2020).

Her voice work in film includes Tim Burton's Corpse Bride and the computer-animated films The Tale of Despereaux and Onward.

Theatre
Ullman has an extensive stage career spanning back to the 1970s. In 1980, she appeared in Victoria Wood's Talent at the Everyman Theatre in Liverpool. In 1982, she played Kate Hardcastle in She Stoops to Conquer. In 1983, she took part in the workshop for Andrew Lloyd Webber's Starlight Express, playing the part of Pearl, and performed in Snoo Wilson's The Grass Widow at the Royal Court Theatre with Alan Rickman.

In 1990, she starred opposite actor Morgan Freeman as Kate in Shakespeare in the Park's production of Taming of the Shrew set in the Wild West for Joe Papp. In 1991, she performed on Broadway in Jay Presson Allen's one-woman show The Big Love, based on the book of the same name. Both Taming of the Shrew and The Big Love garnered her Theatre World Awards.

In 2011, she returned to the British stage in the Stephen Poliakoff drama My City. Her performance earned her an Evening Standard Theatre Awards nomination for Best Actress. In 2012, she joined the cast of Eric Idle's What About Dick?, described as a 1940s-style stand-up improv musical comedy radio play, taking on three roles. The show played for four nights in April in Los Angeles at the Orpheum Theater. She had performed the piece previously in a test run for Idle back in 2007. Cast members included Idle, Eddie Izzard, Billy Connolly, Russell Brand, Tim Curry, Jane Leeves, Jim Piddock, and Sophie Winkleman. On 6 October 2014, it was formally announced that she would star in a limited engagement of The Band Wagon.

Personal life
Ullman married producer Allan McKeown in 1983. The couple have two children: Mabel, born in 1986, and Johnny, born in 1991. On 24 December 2013, McKeown died at home from prostate cancer. Ullman's mother died in a fire at her flat on 23 March 2015. An inquest ruled the death to be accidental. She was 85 years old.

In September 2018, Ullman said that her daughter was pregnant and that she was about to become a grandmother for the first time.

Ullman acquired American citizenship in December 2006. She holds dual citizenship in the United Kingdom and the United States. In 2006, she topped the list for the "Wealthiest British Comedians", with an estimated wealth of £75 million. In 2017, The Sunday Times estimated her wealth to be £80 million.

An avid knitter, she co-wrote a knitting book, Knit 2 Together: Patterns and Stories for Serious Knitting Fun in 2006.

Acting credits and awards

Discography

 You Broke My Heart in 17 Places (1983)
 You Caught Me Out (1984)

Bibliography

References

Further reading
 
 British music charts history for Tracey Ullman
 Guinness Book of British Hit Singles 7th Edition
 Archive of an Entertainment Weekly story by Frank Spotnitz on 1992 lawsuit

External links

 
 
 
 
 Tracey Ullman at the British Film Institute
 
 Tracey Ullman Facebook page
 All About Tracey – a fan site 
 The Tracey Ullman Archives

 
1959 births
20th-century English comedians
20th-century American comedians
20th-century English actresses
20th-century American actresses
20th-century American singers
20th-century English singers
20th-century English writers
20th-century American non-fiction writers
20th-century American women singers
20th-century American women writers
21st-century British businesspeople
21st-century English comedians
21st-century American businesspeople
21st-century American comedians
21st-century English actresses
21st-century American actresses
21st-century American women singers
21st-century English writers
21st-century American non-fiction writers
21st-century American women writers
Actresses from Berkshire
Alumni of the Italia Conti Academy of Theatre Arts
Audiobook narrators
Best Entertainment Performance BAFTA Award (television) winners
Best Musical or Comedy Actress Golden Globe (television) winners
English people of Polish descent
English republicans
British sketch comedians
American people of Polish descent
American people of Romani descent
American comedy writers
American women company founders
American company founders
American film actresses
American impressionists (entertainers)
American parodists
American satirists
American stage actresses
American sketch comedians
American television actresses
American television directors
American television producers
American women television producers
American television writers
American voice actresses
American women comedians
English comedy writers
English women pop singers
English film actresses
English impressionists (entertainers)
British parodists
English satirists
English stage actresses
English television actresses
English television directors
English television producers
British women television producers
British television producers
English television writers
British women television writers
English voice actresses
English women comedians
English women writers
Romani actresses
Romani writers
English emigrants to the United States
Living people
California Democrats
Outstanding Performance by a Female Actor in a Comedy Series Screen Actors Guild Award winners
People educated at Burnham Grammar School
People educated at Licensed Victuallers' School
People from Slough
People with acquired American citizenship
Primetime Emmy Award winners
Stiff Records artists
American women television directors
American women television writers
British social commentators
American women non-fiction writers
Women satirists
21st-century American businesswomen
British women company founders
21st-century American singers